West Boone Township is one of twenty-four townships in Bates County, Missouri, and is part of the Kansas City metropolitan area within the USA.  As of the 2000 census, its population was 582.

West Boone Township derives its name from the pioneer Daniel Boone.

Geography
According to the United States Census Bureau, West Boone Township covers an area of 30.24 square miles (78.33 square kilometers); of this, 30.06 square miles (77.86 square kilometers, 99.4 percent) is land and 0.18 square miles (0.47 square kilometers, 0.6 percent) is water.

Cities, towns, villages
 Drexel (south edge)
 Merwin

Unincorporated towns
 South Drexel at 
(This list is based on USGS data and may include former settlements.)

Adjacent townships
 Coldwater Township, Cass County (north)
 Everett Township, Cass County (northeast)
 East Boone Township (east)
 Elkhart Township (southeast)
 West Point Township (south)
 Sugar Creek Township, Miami County, Kansas (west)

Cemeteries
The township contains Edgewood Cemetery.

Airports and landing strips
 Arvin Ranch Airport

School districts
 Drexel R-IV
 Miami R-I

Political districts
 Missouri's 4th congressional district
 State House District 120
 State House District 125
 State Senate District 31

References
 United States Census Bureau 2008 TIGER/Line Shapefiles
 United States Board on Geographic Names (GNIS)
 United States National Atlas

External links
 US-Counties.com
 City-Data.com

Townships in Bates County, Missouri
Townships in Missouri